Torrente 5: Operación Eurovegas is a 2014 Spanish action comedy film directed, written and starring Santiago Segura. It is the fifth and, to date, the last film of the Torrente saga.

Plot 
The fiction starts in 2018, with Torrente getting out of jail. He decides to rob a casino together with the help of a bunch of incompetent people.

Cast 

Production 
Torrente 5 had a budget of €8.5 million. The film was produced by Amiguetes Enterprises (executive production) alongside Atresmedia Cine, Telefónica Studios and ONO. It was written and directed by Santiago Segura whereas Teo Delgado was responsible for the cinematography. The score was composed by Roque Baños. Mónica Naranjo performs the vocals in the credit scene. Filming began on 25 November 2013 and wrapped on 10 March 2014. Shooting locations included the Madrid region, the Dominican Republic and the Province of Ciudad Real.

Release 
Distributed by Sony Pictures Releasing de España, the film was theatrically released in Spain on 3 October 2014. It became the third largest grossing Spanish film of 2014, after Spanish Affair and El niño.

Awards and nominations 

|-
| align = "center" | 2015 || 29th Goya Awards || Best Special Effects || Antonio Molina & Ferran Piquer ||  || 
|}

See also 
 List of Spanish films of 2014

References 
Informational notes

Citations

External links 
 Torrente 5: Operación Eurovegas at ICAA's Catálogo de Cinespañol

Films set in 2018
2014 films
2010s Spanish-language films
2014 action comedy films
Spanish action comedy films
Films set in Spain
Films shot in Spain
Films directed by Santiago Segura
Films scored by Roque Baños
Atresmedia Cine films
2010s Spanish films
Films shot in the Community of Madrid
Films shot in the province of Ciudad Real
Films shot in the Dominican Republic